Myxogastromycetidae is a subclass of Myxogastria. It can be divided into the orders Echinostelida and Physarida.

References

Myxogastria
Amorphea subclasses